Three of Hearts is a 1993 comedy-romance film directed by Yurek Bogayevicz and starring William Baldwin, Kelly Lynch, Sherilyn Fenn and Joe Pantoliano.

Plot 
It involves a love triangle: a straight gigolo Joe (William Baldwin), his lesbian best friend Connie (Kelly Lynch), and her former lover, an attractive bisexual woman Ellen (Sherilyn Fenn).

Connie is desperate to win Ellen back and Joe volunteers to break Ellen's heart to convince her that heterosexual relationships are inferior to lesbian ones. The hope is that the disaster will cause her to return to Connie. Neither counts on Joe having feelings for Ellen nor expects her to discover the trick.

Cast
 William Baldwin as Joe Casella 
 Kelly Lynch as Connie Czapski
 Sherilyn Fenn as Ellen Armstrong
 Joe Pantoliano as Mickey
 Gail Strickland as Yvonne
 Cec Verrell as Allison
 Claire Callaway as Isabella
 Marek Johnson as Gail
 Monique Mannen as Daphne
 Timothy Stickney as Ralph
 Frank Ray Perilli as Patient
 Tony Amendola as Harvey
 Keith MacKechnie as Frankie
 Ann Ryerson as Jackie
 Gloria Gifford as Operator
 Lin Shaye as Operator
 Jan A.P. Kaczmarek as Priest
 Tawny Kitaen as Woman In Bar

Release

Critical response
The movie received  mixed reviews.  It currently has a 53% rating on Rotten Tomatoes based on 17 reviews.

Box office
The movie debuted at No. 7 with $1,928,076 in its first weekend behind such films as Indecent Proposal and Benny & Joon.

References

External links 
 
 
 

1993 films
1993 romantic comedy films
1993 LGBT-related films
American LGBT-related films
American sex comedy films
Female bisexuality in film
Films about prostitution in the United States
LGBT-related sex comedy films
LGBT-related romantic comedy films
1990s English-language films
Films directed by Yurek Bogayevicz
1990s American films